The 144th Pennsylvania House of Representatives District is located in Southeastern Pennsylvania and has been represented since 2023 by Brian Munroe.

District profile
The 144th Pennsylvania House of Representatives District is located in Bucks County. It is made up of the following areas:

 Chalfont
 Dublin
 Hilltown Township
 New Britain
 New Britain Township
 Silverdale
 Telford (Bucks County Portion)
 Warrington Township

Representatives

Recent election results

References

External links
District map from the United States Census Bureau
Pennsylvania House Legislative District Maps from the Pennsylvania Redistricting Commission.  
Population Data for District 144 from the Pennsylvania Redistricting Commission.

144
Government of Bucks County, Pennsylvania